The Farmland Assessment Act of 1964 provided for reduced taxes on farmland in New Jersey in an effort to reduce the sale of farmland to developers for housing and commercial space.

History
The effect was to slow development, and farmland loss, but when prices rose for land the farms were still sold for profit. The act was supplemented with the Agriculture Retention and Development Act of 1981 which put permanent deed restrictions on the sale of farm properties. The Farmland Assessment Act continues today allowing tax exemptions for property 5 acres or more in size devoted to farmland or woodland.

References

External links

More on Farmland Assessment

New Jersey statutes
1964 in law
1964 in New Jersey
Taxation in New Jersey